Edward Dyson (10 October 1919 – 5 March 2020) was a British sailor. He competed in the Dragon event at the 1952 Summer Olympics.

See also
 List of centenarians (sportspeople)

References

External links
 

1919 births
2020 deaths
British male sailors (sport)
Olympic sailors of Great Britain
Sailors at the 1952 Summer Olympics – Dragon
British centenarians
British people in colonial India
Men centenarians